The 12009 / 12010 Mumbai Central - Ahmedabad Shatabdi Express is an Express train of Shatabdi class belonging to Indian Railways that runs between  and  in India. It is a 6 days in week service. Earlier it would operate excluding Fridays, later it was changed to exclude Sundays. It is the first Shatabdi Express which contains Vistadome coach on both ends.

It operates as train number 12009 from Mumbai Central to Ahmedabad Junction and as train number 12010 in the reverse direction. This train is the fastest train among other trains on the Mumbai - Ahmedabad route. It is faster than Ahmedabad - Mumbai Central Tejas Express and Mumbai Central-Ahmedabad Double Decker Express.

Coaches

Route & Halts

Traction 
It is hauled by a Vadodara-based WAP-7 locomotive from end to end.

Shatabdi Express trains
Mumbai–Ahmedabad trains
Railway services introduced in 1994

Speed
130 kmph is in the major part of the route. The maximum permissible speed of this train and route is 130 kmph in Virar – Ahmedabad route (VIRAR - VADODARA  part of this route is common with GODHRA - VIRAR section of New Delhi – Mumbai route), 110 kmph in only 26 km long VIRAR – BORIVALI route, 100 kmph in only 30 km long BORIVALI – Mumbai Central (MMCT, formerly BCT) route.

Railway Board has approved the speed policy which envisages operation of passenger trains at 160 kmph on Delhi–Mumbai (incl BRC or Vadodara - ADI or Ahmedabad) route and this train passes through Mumbai Central – Vadodara – Ahmedabad route but it is still unclear what will its impact on this train in future like increasing of speed but not up to 160 kmph or up to 160 kmph.

Timings